Listen and Learn may refer to:

Film and TV
"Listen and Learn", TV advertisement by JUST EAT

Music
Listen & Learn (Hexstatic album)
Listen and Learn, a 2001 album by Screaming Orphans

Educational materials
Listen & Learn (language courses), foreign language courses published by Dover Publications
Listen and Learn, educational audio and video album by ILAM for Music education in Africa

See also
"Stop, Listen and Learn", an episode of the Canadian-British children's series Noddy
Listen, Learn, Read On, a 2002 Deep Purple box set, or the title track
"Listen and Learn with Phonics", Sally Watson
"Look, Listen and Learn", Shanghai Foreign Language School